The Handball Cup of Bosnia and Herzegovina is the national handball cup of Bosnia and Herzegovina. It is organized for men and women and run by the Handball Federation of Bosnia and Herzegovina. Before 2001/2002 season, there were three separated cup competitions, organized on ethnical principles. In 1998 and 1999 joint play-off was organized, and in 2000 three-teams-league, as the clubs from Republika Srpska took part for the first time. It is a regular cup competition since 2001/2002 season.

Cup winners

Performance by club

Winners of regional cups
BiH Cup winners

This cup was organized by Handball Federation of Bosnia and Herzegovina, and recognized by EHF.

Cup of Republika Srpska winners

Cup of Herzeg-Bosnia winners

See also
Handball Championship of Bosnia and Herzegovina

References

External links
Official website 

Handball competitions in Bosnia and Herzegovina